This article is part of the history of rail transport by country series.

The railway system of Great Britain started with the building of local isolated wooden wagonways starting in the 1560s. A patchwork of local rail links operated by small private railway companies developed in the late 18th century. These isolated links expanded during the railway boom of the 1840s into a national network, although still run by dozens of competing companies. Over the course of the 19th and early 20th centuries, these amalgamated or were bought by competitors until only a handful of larger companies remained (see railway mania). The entire network was brought under government control during the First World War and a number of advantages of amalgamation and planning were demonstrated. However, the government resisted calls for the nationalisation of the network. In 1923, almost all the remaining companies were grouped into the "Big Four": the Great Western Railway, the London and North Eastern Railway, the London, Midland and Scottish Railway and the Southern Railway. The "Big Four" were joint-stock public companies and they continued to run the railway system until 31 December 1947.

From the start of 1948, the "Big Four" were nationalised to form British Railways. Though there were few initial changes to services, usage increased and the network became profitable. Declining passenger numbers and financial losses in the late 1950s and early 1960s prompted the closure of many branch and main lines, and small stations, under the Beeching Axe. High-speed inter-city trains were introduced in the 1970s. The 1980s saw severe cuts in rail subsidies and above-inflation increases in fares, and losses decreased. Railway operations were privatised during 1994–1997. Ownership of the track and infrastructure passed to Railtrack, whilst passenger operations were franchised to individual private sector operators (originally there were 25 franchises) and the freight services were sold outright. Since privatisation, passenger volumes have increased to their highest ever level, but whether this is due to privatisation is disputed. The Hatfield accident set in motion a series of events that resulted in the ultimate collapse of Railtrack and its replacement with Network Rail, a state-owned, not-for-dividend company.

Before 1830: The pioneers

A wagonway, essentially a railway powered by animals drawing the cars or wagons, was used by German miners at Caldbeck, Cumbria, England, perhaps from the 1560s. A wagonway was built at Prescot, near Liverpool, sometime around 1600, possibly as early as 1594. Owned by Philip Layton, the line carried coal from a pit near Prescot Hall to a terminus about half a mile away.

Another wagonway was Sir Francis Willoughby's Wollaton Wagonway in Nottinghamshire built between 1603 and 1604 to carry coal.

As early as 1671 railed roads were in use in Durham to ease the conveyance of coal; the first of these was the Tanfield Wagonway. Many of these tramroads or wagon ways were built in the 17th and 18th centuries. They used simply straight and parallel rails of timber on which carts with simple flanged iron wheels were drawn by horses, enabling several wagons to be moved simultaneously. The first public railway in the world was the Lake Lock Rail Road, a narrow gauge railway built near Wakefield, West Yorkshire, England.

Although the idea of wooden-railed wagonways originated in Germany in the 16th century, the first use of steam locomotives was in Britain. Its earliest "railways" were straight and were constructed from parallel rails of timber on which ran horse-drawn carts. These were succeeded in 1793 when Benjamin Outram constructed a mile-long tramway with L-shaped cast iron rails. These rails became obsolete when William Jessop began to manufacture cast iron rails without guiding ledges – the wheels of the carts had flanges instead. Cast iron is brittle and so the rails tended to break easily. Consequently, in 1820, John Birkenshaw introduced a method of rolling wrought iron rails, which were used from then onwards.

The first passenger-carrying public railway was opened by the Swansea and Mumbles Railway at Oystermouth in 1807, using horse-drawn carriages on an existing tramline.

In 1802, Richard Trevithick designed and built the first (unnamed) steam locomotive to run on smooth rails.

The first commercially successful steam locomotive was Salamanca, built in 1812 by John Blenkinsop and Matthew Murray for the  gauge Middleton Railway. Salamanca was a rack and pinion locomotive, with cog wheels driven by two cylinders embedded into the top of the centre-flue boiler.

In 1813, William Hedley and Timothy Hackworth designed a locomotive (Puffing Billy) for use on the tramway between Stockton and Darlington. Puffing Billy featured piston rods extending upwards to pivoting beams, connected in turn by rods to a crankshaft beneath the frames which, in turn, drove the gears attached to the wheels. This meant that the wheels were coupled, allowing better traction. A year later, George Stephenson improved on that design with his first locomotive Blücher, which was the first locomotive to use single-flanged wheels.

That design persuaded the backers of the proposed Stockton and Darlington Railway to appoint Stephenson as Engineer for the line in 1821. While traffic was originally intended to be horse-drawn, Stephenson carried out a fresh survey of the route to allow steam haulage. The Act was subsequently amended to allow the usage of steam locomotives and also to allow passengers to be carried on the railway. The 25-mile (40 km) long route opened on 27 September 1825 and, with the aid of Stephenson's Locomotion No. 1, was the first locomotive-hauled public railway in the world.

1830 – 1922: Early development

In 1830 the Liverpool and Manchester Railway opened. This set the pattern for modern railways. It was the world's first inter-city passenger railway and the first to have 'scheduled' services, terminal stations and services as we know them today. The railways carried freight and passengers with also the world's first goods terminal station at the Park Lane railway goods station at Liverpool's south docks, accessed by the 1.26-mile Wapping Tunnel. In 1836, at the Liverpool end the line was extended to Lime Street station in Liverpool's city centre via a 1.1 mile long tunnel.

Many of the first public railways were built as local rail links operated by small private railway companies. With increasing rapidity, more and more lines were built, often with scant regard for their potential for traffic. The 1840s were by far the biggest decade for railway growth. In 1840, when the decade began, railway lines in Britain were few and scattered but, within ten years, a virtually complete network had been laid down and the vast majority of towns and villages had a rail connection and sometimes two or three. Over the course of the 19th and early 20th centuries, most of the pioneering independent railway companies amalgamated or were bought by competitors, until only a handful of larger companies remained (see Railway Mania).

The period also saw a steady increase in government involvement, especially in safety matters. The 1840 "Act for Regulating Railways" empowered the Board of Trade to appoint railway inspectors. The Railway Inspectorate was established in 1840, to enquire into the causes of accidents and recommend ways of avoiding them. As early as 1844, a bill had been put before Parliament suggesting the state purchase of the railways; this was not adopted. It did, however, lead to the introduction of minimum standards for the construction of carriages and the compulsory provision of 3rd class accommodation for passengers - so-called "Parliamentary trains".

The railway companies ceased to be profitable after the mid-1870s. Nationalisation of the railways was first proposed by William Ewart Gladstone as early as the 1840s, and calls for nationalisation continued throughout that century, with F. Keddell writing in 1890 that "The only valid ground for maintaining the monopoly would be the proof that the Railway Companies have made a fair and proper use of their great powers, and have conduced to the prosperity of the people. But the exact contrary is the case." The entire network was brought under government control during the First World War, and a number of advantages of amalgamation and planning were revealed. However, the Conservative members of the wartime coalition government resisted calls for the formal nationalisation of the railways in 1921.

1923 – 1947: The Big Four 

On 1 January 1923, almost all the railway companies were grouped into the Big Four: the Great Western Railway, the London and North Eastern Railway, the London, Midland and Scottish Railway and the Southern Railway companies. A number of other lines, already operating as joint railways, remained separate from the Big Four; these included the Somerset and Dorset Joint Railway and the Midland and Great Northern Joint Railway. The "Big Four" were joint-stock public companies and they continued to run the railway system until 31 December 1947.

The competition from road transport during the 1920s and 1930s greatly reduced the revenue available to the railways, even though the needs for maintenance on the network had never been higher, as investment had been deferred over the past decade. Rail companies accused the government of favouring road haulage through the construction of roads subsidised by the taxpayer, while restricting the rail industry's ability to use flexible pricing because it was held to nationally agreed rate cards. The government response was to commission several inconclusive reports; the Salter Report of 1933 finally recommended that road transport should be taxed directly to fund the roads and increased Vehicle Excise Duty and fuel duties were introduced. It also noted that many small lines would never be likely to compete with road haulage. Although these road pricing changes helped their survival, the railways entered a period of slow decline, owing to a lack of investment and changes in transport policy and lifestyles.

During the Second World War, the companies' managements joined together, effectively operating as one company. Assisting the country's 'war effort' put a severe strain on the railways' resources and a substantial maintenance backlog developed. After 1945, for both practical and ideological reasons, the government decided to bring the rail service into the public sector.

1948 – 1994: British Rail

From the start of 1948, the railways were nationalised to form British Railways (latterly "British Rail") under the control of the British Transport Commission. Though there were few initial changes to the service, usage increased and the network became profitable. Regeneration of track and stations was completed by 1954. Rail revenue fell and, in 1955, the network again ceased to be profitable. The mid-1950s saw the hasty introduction of diesel and electric rolling stock to replace steam in a modernisation plan costing many millions of pounds but the expected transfer back from road to rail did not occur and losses began to mount. This failure to make the railways more profitable through investment led governments of all political persuasions to restrict rail investment to a drip feed and seek economies through cutbacks.

The desire for profitability led to a major reduction in the network during the mid-1960s. Dr. Richard Beeching was given the task by the government of re-organising the railways ("the Beeching Axe"). This policy resulted in many branch lines and secondary routes being closed because they were deemed uneconomic. The closure of stations serving rural communities removed much feeder traffic from main line passenger services. The closure of many freight depots that had been used by larger industries such as coal and iron led to much freight transferring to road haulage. The closures were extremely unpopular with the general public at that time and remain so today.

Passenger levels decreased steadily from the late fifties to late seventies. Passenger services then experienced a renaissance with the introduction of the high-speed InterCity 125 trains in the late 1970s and early 1980s. The 1980s saw severe cuts in government funding and above-inflation increases in fares, but the service became more cost-effective.
Following sectorisation of British Rail, InterCity became profitable. InterCity became one of Britain's top 150 companies operating city centre to city centre travel across the nation from Aberdeen and Inverness in the north to Poole and Penzance in the south.

Between 1994 and 1997, British Rail was privatised. Ownership of the track and infrastructure passed to Railtrack, passenger operations were franchised to individual private sector operators (originally there were 25 franchises) and the freight services sold outright (six companies were set up, but five of these were sold to the same buyer). The Conservative government under John Major said that privatisation would see an improvement in passenger services. Passenger levels have since increased strongly.

1995 onwards: Post-privatisation 

Since privatisation, numbers of passengers have grown rapidly; by 2010 the railways were carrying more passengers than at any time since the 1920s. and by 2014 passenger numbers had expanded to their highest level ever, more than doubling in the 20 years since privatisation. Train fares cost more than under British Rail.
 
The railways have become significantly safer since privatisation and are now the safest in Europe. However, the public image of rail travel was damaged by some prominent accidents shortly after privatisation. These included the Southall rail crash (where a train with its faulty Automatic Warning System disconnected passed a stop signal), the Ladbroke Grove rail crash (also caused by a train passing a stop signal) and the Hatfield accident (caused by a rail fragmenting due to the development of microscopic cracks).

Following the Hatfield accident, the rail infrastructure company Railtrack imposed over 1,200 emergency speed restrictions across its network and instigated an extremely costly nationwide track replacement programme. The consequential severe operational disruption to the national network and the company's spiralling costs set in motion the series of events which resulted in the ultimate collapse of the company and its replacement with Network Rail, a state-owned, not-for-dividend company.

Since April 2016, the British railway network has been severely disrupted on many occasions by wide-reaching rail strikes, affecting rail franchises across the country. The industrial action began on Southern services as a dispute over the planned introduction of driver-only operation, and has since expanded to cover many different issues affecting the rail industry; as of February 2018, the majority of the industrial action remains unresolved, with further strikes planned. The scale, impact and bitterness of the nationwide rail strikes have been compared to the 1984–85 miners' strike by the media.

As of 2018, government subsidies to the rail industry in real terms were roughly three times that of the late 1980s.

See also
 Economic history of the United Kingdom
 History of rail transport
 Rail transport in Great Britain
 Rail freight in Great Britain
 List of early British railway companies
 History of rail transport in Ireland
 British postal system
 List of railway lines in Great Britain
 List of closed railway lines in Great Britain
 British narrow gauge railways
 British industrial narrow gauge railways
 Railway electrification in Great Britain
 British electric multiple units
 British railcars and diesel multiple units
History by era
 History of rail transport in Great Britain to 1830
 History of rail transport in Great Britain 1830–1922
 History of rail transport in Great Britain 1923–1947
 History of rail transport in Great Britain 1948–1994
 History of rail transport in Great Britain 1995 to date

References

Sources

General

Pre-1830

1830–1922

 McKenna, Frank. "Victorian Railway Workers," History Workshop (spring 1975) #1 pp. 26–73. in JSTOR

1923–1947 

 
 
 
 {{cite book | last=Nock | first=O.S. | year=1982 | title=A History of the LMS. Vol. 2: The Record Breaking 'Thirties, 1931-1939 | publisher=George Allen & Unwin | isbn=978-0-04-385093-0 | url-access=registration | url=https://archive.org/details/historyoflms0000nock }}

1948–1994 

 
 

Further reading

 Bagwell, Philip. The transport revolution 1770-1985 (Routledge, 1988) covers all forms.
 Bagwell, Philip S. The Railway Clearing House: In the British Economy 1842-1922 (Taylor & Francis, 2022).
 Bogart, Dan, et al. "Railways, divergence, and structural change in 19th century England and Wales." Journal of Urban Economics 128 (2022): 103390. online
 Brandon, David L., and Alan Brooke. The Railway Haters: Opposition To Railways, From the 19th to 21st Centuries (Pen and Sword, 2019).
 Casson, Mark. The world's first railway system: enterprise, competition, and regulation on the railway network in Victorian Britain (Oxford UP, 2009).
 Clapham, J. H. An economic history of modern Britain; The early railway age, 1820-1850 (1930) online
 Crafts, Nicholas, Timothy Leunig, and Abay Mulatu. "Were British railway companies well managed in the early twentieth century? " Economic History Review 61.4 (2008): 842-866. online
 Crafts, Nicholas, Timothy Leunig, and Abay Mulatu. "Corrigendum: Were British railway companies well managed in the early twentieth century?" Economic History Review 64.1 (2011): 351-356. online
 Dobrzynski, Jan. British railway tickets (Bloomsbury, 2013).
 Ellis, Cuthbert Hamilton. British Railway History. An outline from the accession of William IV to the Nationalisation of Railways, 1830–1876 (vol 1. G. Allen and Unwin, 1954)
 Ellis, Cuthbert Hamilton. British Railway History: An Outline from the Accession of William IV to the Nationalization of Railways, 1877-1947. Vol. 2 (G. Allen and Unwin, 1959); see online review.
 Farrington, Karen. Great Victorian Railway Journeys: How Modern Britain Was Built by Victorian Steam Power (2012).
 Glynn, John J. "The development of British railway accounting: 1800–1911." Accounting Historians Journal 11.1 (1984): 103-118. online
 Gourvish, Terence Richard. Railways and the British economy, 1830-1914 (Macmillan International Higher Education, 1980).
 Gourvish, Terence Richard et al. British Railways 1948-73: A business history (Cambridge University Press, 1986).
 Gourvish, Terry. British Rail 1974-1997: From Integration to Privatisation (Oxford UP, 2002).
 Gourvish, Terence R. "A British Business Elite: the chief executive managers of the railway industry, 1850-1922." Business History Review 47.3 (1973): 289-316.
 Haywood, Russell. Railways, urban development and town planning in Britain: 1948–2008 (Routledge, 2016).
 Jenkins, Simon. Britain's 100 Best Railway Stations (2017)
 Leunig, Timothy. "Time is money: a re-assessment of the passenger social savings from Victorian British railways." Journal of Economic History 66.3 (2006): 635-673. online; calculates railways accounted for 1/6 sixth of economy-wide productivity growth in 1843 to 1912.
 Letherby, Gayle, and Gillian Reynolds. Train tracks: work, play and politics on the railways (Routledge, 2020).
 Letherby, Gayle, and Gillian Reynolds. "Making connections: the relationship between train travel and the processes of work and leisure." Sociological Research Online 8.3 (2003): 32-45.
 McLean, Iain. "The origin and strange history of regulation in the UK: three case studies in search of a theory." ESF/SCSS Exploratory Workshop The Politics of Regulation (2002) online.
 McLean, Iain, and Christopher Foster. "The political economy of regulation: interests, ideology, voters, and the UK Regulation of Railways Act 1844." Public Administration 70.3 (1992): 313-331.
 Maggs, Colin. Great Britain's Railways: A New History (Amberley, 2018).
 Perkin, Harold. The age of the railway (1970) online
 Reid, Douglas A. "The ‘Iron Roads' and ‘the Happiness of the Working Classes’ The Early Development and Social Significance of the Railway Excursion." Journal of Transport History 17.1 (1996): 57-73.
 Simmons, Jack, and Gordon Biddle. eds. The Oxford Companion to British Railway History. From 1603 to the 1990s (Oxford University Press, 1997) online review
 Strangleman, Tim. Work identity at the end of the line?: privatisation and culture change in the UK rail industry (Springer, 2004).
 Turnock, David. An historical geography of railways in Great Britain and Ireland (Routledge, 2016).
 Vaughan, Adrian. Railwaymen, Politics and Money: the great age of railways in Britain (John Murray, 1997) online.
 Vaughan, Adrian. Obstruction Danger: Significant British Railway Accidents, 1890-1986  (Motorbooks International, 1989). online
 Wojtczak, Helena. Railwaywomen: Exploitation, betrayal and triumph in the workplace (Hastings Press, 2005).
 Wragg, David. A Historical Dictionary of Railways in the British Isles (Casemate, 2009).
 Wragg, David. The Race to the North: Rivalry & Record-Breaking in the Golden Age of Stream (Pen and Sword, 2013).

Historiography, restoration and memory
 Beeston, Erin. Spaces of Industrial Heritage: a history of uses, perceptions and the re-making of Liverpool Road Station (University of Manchester, 2020) online.
 Biddle, Gordon. "British Railway History: Jack Simmons' Last Thoughts." Journal-Railway And Canal Historical Society 34.5 (2003): 324-326 online.
 Boughey, Joseph. "From Transport's Golden Ages to an Age of Tourism: LTC Rolt, Waterway Revival and Railway Preservation in Britain, 1944–54." Journal of Transport History 34.1 (2013): 22-38.
 Boyes, Grahame, and Matthew Searle. "A Bibliography of the History of Inland Waterways, Railways and Road Transport in the British Isles, 2007." Interchange 39 (2006): 4-20.
 Burman, Peter, and Michael Stratton, eds. Conserving the railway heritage (Taylor & Francis, 1997).
 Carter, Ian, ed. British railway enthusiasm (Manchester University Press, 2017).
 Mom, Gijs. "What kind of transport history did we get? Half a century of JTH and the future of the field." Journal of Transport History 24.2 (2003): 121-138.
 Reeves, Christopher D. "Policy for conservation of heritage railway signal boxes in Great Britain." Historic Environment: Policy & Practice 7.1 (2016): 43-59 online.
 Strangleman, Tim. "Constructing the Past: Railway History from below or a Study in Nostalgia?." Journal of Transport History 23.2 (2002): 147-158.
 Taylor, James. "Business in Pictures: Representations of Railway Enterprise in the Satirical Press in Britain 1845–1870." Past & Present'' 189.1 (2005): 111-145; cartoons unveiled big business as greedy and corrupt. online.

 
Rail transport in Great Britain